Mika is a given name, a nickname and a surname. Notable people and fictional characters with the name include:

People known just as Mika 
 Mika (singer) (born 1983), Lebanese-born British singer-songwriter Michael Penniman, Jr.
 Mika (footballer, born 1987), Portuguese football defender Michael da Conceição Figueiredo
 Mika (footballer, born 1991), Portuguese football goalkeeper Michael Simões Domingues
 Mika (Armenian singer), Michael Varosyan, who represented Armenia in the Junior Eurovision Song Contest 2015
 Mika X (born 1962), New Zealand Maori performing artist

Fictional characters
 Mika, a character in the horror game Ao Oni

Mika as a given name

Male given name (primarily used in Finland) 
 Mika Aaltola (born 1969), Finnish political scientist and director of the Finnish Institute of International Affairs
 Mika Aaltonen (born 1965), Finnish football player
 Mika Brzezinski (born 1967), American talk-show host
 Mika Chunuonsee (born 1989), Thai football player
 Mika Häkkinen (born 1968), Finnish former Formula One double World Champion
 Mika Halvari (born 1970), Finnish shot putter
 Mika Hannula (born 1979), Swedish ice hockey player
 Mika Helin (born 1978), Finnish football player
 Mika Horiuchi (born 1986), Japanese-American musician
 Mika Immonen (born 1972), Finnish pool player
 Mika Ják (died after 1202), Hungarian noble
 Mika Kallio (born 1982), Finnish motorcycle racer
 Mika Karppinen (born 1971), Finnish drummer better known as Gas Lipstick
 Mika Kaurismäki (born 1955), Finnish film director
 Mika Koivuniemi (born 1967), Finnish ten-pin bowler
 Mika Kojonkoski (born 1963), Finnish ski jumper and politician
 Mika Kuusisto (born 1967), Finnish cross-country skier
 Mika Lahtinen (born 1985), Finnish football player
 Mika Laitinen (born 1973), Finnish ski jumper
 Mika Luttinen (born 1971), Finnish musician
 Mika Muranen (born 1971), Finnish prisoner
 Mika Myllylä (1969-2011), Finnish cross-country skier
 Mika Mäkeläinen (born 1965), Finnish journalist and nonfiction writer
 Mika Niskanen (born 1973), Finnish ice hockey player
 Mika Noronen (born 1979), Finnish ice hockey player
 Mika Nurmela (born 1971), Finnish football player
 Mika-Matti Paatelainen (born 1967), Finnish football manager, better known as Mixu Paatelainen
 Mika Peltonen (born 1965), Finnish military officer
 Mika Pohjola (born 1971), Finnish jazz pianist
 Mikaele Ravalawa (born 1997), Fijian rugby league player
 Mika Ronkainen (born 1970), Finnish film director
 Mika Salo (born 1966), Finnish auto racer
 Mika Sankala (born 1964), Finnish football manager and former footballer
 Mika Singh (born 1977), Indian entertainer
 Mika Špiljak (1916–2007), Yugoslav politician
 Mika Strömberg (born 1970), Finnish ice hockey player
 Mika Tauriainen (born 1975), Finnish rock singer
 Mika Vainio, member of the Finnish electronic duo Pan sonic
 Mika Vasara (born 1983), Finnish shot putter
 Mika Väyrynen (footballer) (born 1981), Finnish football player
 Mika Vukona, (born 1982), Fijian-born New Zealand basketball player
 Mika Waltari (1908–1979), Finnish author
 Mika Zibanejad, (born 1993), Swedish ice hockey player

Female given name (美佳, 美香, etc., primarily used in Japan) 
 Mika Akino (born 1973), the Japanese wrestler AKINO
 Mika Arisaka (born 1974), Japanese-American singer
 Mika Boorem (born 1987), American actress
 Mika Brzezinski (born 1967), American television journalist, co-host of Morning Joe
 Mika Doi (born 1956), Japanese voice actress
 Mika Handa, singer with the band Mika Bomb
 , Japanese swimmer
 , Japanese ice hockey player
 Mika Kanai (born 1964), Japanese voice actress
 Mika Kato, namesake singer of the Sadistic Mika Band
 , Japanese actress
 Mika Kawamura (born 1973), Japanese manga artist
 Mika Kikuchi (born 1983), Japanese actress
 Mika Miyazato (born 1989), Japanese golfer
 Mika Nakashima (born 1983), Japanese singer
 Mika Newton (born 1986), Ukrainian singer
 Mika Reyes (born 1994), Filipina volleyball player
 Mika Todd (born 1984), American jazz singer and former Hello! Project member
 Mika Urbaniak (born 1980), American pop singer
 Mika Yamamoto (1967–2012), Japanese journalist
 Mika Yamauchi (born 1969), Japanese volleyball player
 , Japanese middle- and long-distance runner

Nickname or stage name 
 Miroslav Mika Antić (1932–1986), Serbian poet
 Mika Singh (born 1977), Indian singer born Amrik Singh

Fictional characters 
 Mika Ahonen, from the anime/manga Strike Witches
 Mika Grainger, from British school drama series Waterloo Road
 Mika Jougasaki, from The Idolmaster Cinderella Girls video game
 Mika Kamishiro (神代美香), a character in the show Kamen Rider Kabuto, is an older sister of Tsurugi Kamishiro / Kamen Rider Sasword
 Mika Kujiin, one of the main characters in the Kanamemo anime/manga
 Mika Nanakawa (R. Mika), from the fighting video games Street Fighter Alpha 3 and Street Fighter V
 Mika Nogizaka, from the light novel and anime Nogizaka Haruka No Himitsu
 Mika Tahara, from the manga Koizora
 Mika Samuels, from the television series The Walking Dead
 Mika Shimotsuki, from the anime Psycho-Pass
 Mikaela "Mika" Hyakuya, from the anime Seraph of the End
 Mikazuki "Mika" Augus, from Mobile Suit Gundam: Iron Blooded Orphans
 Mika Returna, a new character in the fighting game Under Night In-Birth
 Mika Kanda, a character in the fighting game Gantz
 Mika Koizumi (小泉ミカ), a character in the show Choudenshi Bioman
 Mika Yamaguchi (山口美香), a character in the show Kousoku Sentai Turboranger
 Meekah, character in Moonbug preschool channel Blippi

Mika as a surname (primarily used in Polynesia and Poland) 
 Arūnas Mika (born 1970), Lithuanian association footballer
 Bascha Mika (born 1954), German journalist
 Brad Mika (born 1981), New Zealand rugby union player
 Constantine Mika (born 1989), Samoan rugby league player
 Dylan Mika (1972–2018), New Zealand rugby union player
 Eric Mika (born 1995), American basketball player
 Jarosław Mika (born 1962), Polish military officer
 Mateusz Mika (born 1991), Polish volleyball player
 Michael Mika (born 1968), New Zealand Samoan rugby union player and jurist
 Miché Mika (born 1996), Congolese association footballer
 Setefano Mika, former name of Aunese Curreen (born 1985), Samoan middle-distance runner
 Václav Míka (born 2000), Czech association footballer

Fictional characters
 R. Mika, from the Street Fighter video game series
 Mika Schmidt, a character in the explore game Genshin Impact
 Mikaela "Mika" Hyakuya, a teenage boy and a character in Owari no Seraph

Finnish masculine given names
Japanese feminine given names
Australian given names
Lists of people by nickname
Unisex given names